The Royal Albert Dock is one of three docks in the Royal Group of Docks of East London in the United Kingdom.

History

19th century - establishment
The dock, which was designed by Sir Alexander Rendel as an extension to the Victoria Dock, was constructed by Lucas and Aird and completed in 1880. Two dry docks and machine shops were established to the south at the western end for ship repairs by R & H Green & Silley Weir (later River Thames Shiprepairs Ltd).

Late 20th century - decline and limited redevelopment
From the 1960s onwards, the Royal Albert Dock experienced a steady decline – as did all of London's other docks – as the shipping industry adopted containerisation, which effectively moved traffic downstream to Tilbury. It finally closed to commercial traffic along with the other Royal Docks in 1981.

Redevelopment in the late 20th century included the construction of London City Airport which was built on the south bank of the dock with a single runway and completed in 1987. At the eastern end of the north bank the University of East London Docklands Campus opened in 1999. Redevelopment also included the London Regatta Centre which was built at the western end of the north bank and opened in 2000. In the early 20th century 'Building 1000' was built on the north bank of the dock at a cost of £70 million and was completed in 2004.

Early 21st century - failed redevelopment
In May 2013, the Mayor of London, Boris Johnson, announced a development of the Royal Albert Dock, claimed to be worth £6 billion to the capital's economy and creating over 20,000 jobs. The developer was to be Shanghai-based ABP (Advanced Business Park), with CITIC Construction assigned as main contractor, and Multiplex assigned as principal sub-contractor. Construction officially began in June 2017.

Phase 1 of the project was completed in the first quarter of 2018, consisting of 21 buildings with 460,000 sq ft of office space and 140,000 sq ft of retail and public realm. Phase 2 was designed to begin late 2020, consisting of further office and retail spaces, along with residential units and membership clubs.

However, in February 2022, the business park was described as a "ghost town", half finished and mostly empty. It has become a favoured filming location "because there are never any people around".

The Financial Times suggested in early 2022 that, "the Albert Dock development owned by Beijing-based Advanced Business Park, is on the brink of collapse after creditors appointed administrators to recover unpaid debts".

In July  2022 PwC was appointed as liquidator to 23 companies within the ABP Group.

Gallery

See also
 Albert Dock Seamen's Hospital

References

Transport infrastructure completed in 1880
Infrastructure in London
Buildings and structures in the London Borough of Newham
Geography of the London Borough of Newham
London docks
Port of London
Office buildings in London